The NER Class 290 (LNER Class J77) was a class of 0-6-0T steam locomotives of the North Eastern Railway (NER), rebuilt from an earlier class of 0-4-4T, the NER Bogie Tank Passenger (BTP, later LNER Class G6).

History
Large numbers of the NER G6 0-4-4WT class were made redundant during the 1890s. Forty of these were rebuilt as 0-6-0T shunting locomotives at York Works between 1899 and 1904. Ten further were rebuilt at Darlington, in 1907-8 and a further ten in 1921.

Equipment
The G6 BTP were built with Westinghouse brakes. These were replaced with steam brakes on all but two of the J77s (Nos. 37 and 1437). These were removed in the late 1930s. Twelve of the J77s received vacuum brakes after 1945. This fitting was usually accompanied by the addition of carriage heating equipment.

Use
They were used for general shunting and marshalling coal trains. Withdrawals started in 1933 but 45 survived into British Railways ownership in 1948. Their BR numbers were 68390-68440 (with gaps).

Withdrawal
Most were withdrawn during the 1950s and replaced by diesel shunters. The last J77 to be withdrawn was No. 68408 of South Blyth in February 1961. None were preserved.

References 

0-6-0T locomotives
0290
Railway locomotives introduced in 1899
Scrapped locomotives
Standard gauge steam locomotives of Great Britain
Shunting locomotives